The Helles Memorial is a Commonwealth War Graves Commission war memorial near Sedd el Bahr, in Turkey, on the headland at the tip of the Gallipoli peninsula overlooking the Dardanelles.

The memorial is the main Commonwealth battle memorial for the whole Gallipoli campaign, and also commemorates the 20,956 Commonwealth servicemen with no known grave who died in the campaign in 1915–1916, during the First World War.

The United Kingdom and Indian forces named on the memorial died in operations throughout the peninsula, with main landings at Cape Helles and Suvla Bay, and the Australian and New Zealand Army Corps fought mainly at ANZAC Cove. There are also panels for those who died or were buried at sea in Gallipoli waters.

Other Commonwealth memorials to missing servicemen from the Gallipoli campaign include the Lone Pine Memorial, Hill 60 Memorial, Chunuk Bair Memorial, and Twelve Tree Copse Memorial.  Naval casualties who were buried at sea are also commemorated on the Portsmouth Naval Memorial, Plymouth Naval Memorial and Chatham Naval Memorial in the UK.

French casualties are commemorated at the Morto Bay French Cemetery.  The main Turkish memorial is the Çanakkale Martyrs' Memorial.

Notable people commemorated
Among those commemorated at the Helles Memorial are five Victoria Cross recipients:
Major Cuthbert Bromley
Lieutenant-Colonel Sir John Milbanke, 10th Baronet
Captain Gerald Robert O'Sullivan
Sergeant Frank Edward Stubbs
Sub-Lieutenant Arthur Walderne St Clair Tisdall

Also four rugby union internationals:
Captain William Campbell Church (Scotland)
Captain Arthur James Dingle (England)
Sergeant William Nanson (England)
Captain Eric Templeton Young (Scotland)

And one first-class cricketer:
Lieutenant James Sutcliffe

See also
List of war cemeteries and memorials on the Gallipoli Peninsula

References

Helles Memorial, Commonwealth War Graves Commission
 Gallipoli Helles Memorial Tour

Commonwealth War Graves Commission memorials
World War I memorials in Turkey
Buildings and structures completed in 1924
1924 establishments in Turkey
Buildings and structures in Çanakkale Province